Olivia Molina may refer to:

 Olivia Molina (singer) (born 1946), German-Mexican singer
 Olivia Molina (actress) (born 1980), Spanish actress